This article presents the timeline of events at Treblinka extermination camp during the most deadly phase of the Holocaust in World War II.  All deportations were from German occupied Poland, except where noted.  In most cases the number of deportees are not exact figures, but rather approximations.

Days are listed in chronological order, nevertheless, a number of dates are missing from the below tables which means only that no way bills survived for those particular dates. It does not mean that transports were not arriving or have not been processed from layover yards, when applicable.

Day-by-day

See also
Jewish ghettos in German-occupied Poland

References

 
Warsaw Ghetto
Białystok Ghetto
Częstochowa Ghetto
Theresienstadt Ghetto
1942 in Poland
1943 in Poland
Treblinka
Treblinka
Treblinka